The 1984 Illinois Fighting Illini football team was an American football team that represented the University of Illinois at Urbana-Champaign during the 1984 Big Ten Conference football season. In their fifth year under head coach Mike White, the Illini compiled a 6–3 record and finished in a tie for second place in the Big Ten Conference.

The team's offensive leaders were quarterback Jack Trudeau with 2,724 passing yards, running back Thomas Rooks with 1,056 rushing yards, and wide receiver David Williams with 1,278 receiving yards.

Schedule

References

Illinois
Illinois Fighting Illini football seasons
Illinois Fighting Illini football